Randolph Robert Carlyle (born April 19, 1956) is a Canadian professional ice hockey coach and former player. He is the former head coach of the National Hockey League (NHL)'s Toronto Maple Leafs and the Anaheim Ducks. He won the Stanley Cup in 2007 with the Ducks during his first stint with the team. As a player, Carlyle dressed for over 1,000 games between the Maple Leafs, Pittsburgh Penguins and Winnipeg Jets, winning the James Norris Memorial Trophy as the NHL's best defenceman in the 1980–81 season and serving as a captain of both the Penguins and Jets.

Carlyle is partially of Finnish descent, and was raised in Azilda, just northwest of Sudbury, Ontario.

Junior career

Sudbury Wolves (1973–1976)
Carlyle appeared in 12 games with the Sudbury Wolves in the 1973–74 OHA season, earning eight assists. He played in four playoff games with Sudbury, going pointless, as the Wolves were swept by the Kitchener Rangers in the first round.

Carlyle became a regular on the Wolves' blueline in 1974–75, as he scored 17 goals and 64 points in 67 games to finish tied with Dave Farrish in points among defencemen on the Wolves. In the playoffs, Carlyle scored 3 goals and 9 points in 15 games as Sudbury were eliminated by the Toronto Marlboros in the second round.

Carlyle continued to improve offensively: during the 1975–76 season, he scored 15 goals and 79 points in 60 games to lead the Wolves defence, and finish fourth in team scoring. Carlyle also had an impressive playoff, scoring 6 goals and 19 points in 17 games as the Wolves were eliminated by the Hamilton Fincups in the final round.

Professional career

Toronto Maple Leafs (1976–1978)
Carlyle was drafted into the National Hockey League (NHL) by the Toronto Maple Leafs in the second round, 30th overall, of the 1976 NHL Entry Draft. In his first professional season, 1976–77, he spent the majority of the year with the Maple Leafs in the NHL, scoring 5 assists in 45 games in his rookie season. In nine Stanley Cup playoff games with the Leafs, Carlyle had one assist as the Maple Leafs were eliminated by the Philadelphia Flyers in the quarter-finals. Carlyle had also spent some time of the 1976–77 season with the Dallas Black Hawks of the Central Hockey League (CHL), scoring 2 goals and 9 points in 27 games with the club.

Carlyle split the 1977–78 season between the Dallas Black Hawks and the Toronto Maple Leafs. In 21 games with Dallas, he scored 3 goals and 17 points. With Toronto, he scored 2 goals and 13 points in 47 games, helping the Leafs into the 1978 playoffs. In seven playoff games, he recorded one assist as the Maple Leafs were eliminated by the Montreal Canadiens in the semi-finals.

On June 14, 1978, Carlyle (alongside George Ferguson) was traded to the Pittsburgh Penguins in exchange for Dave Burrows.

Pittsburgh Penguins (1978–1984)
Carlyle joined the Penguins for the 1978–79 season, where in 70 games he had significant improvement offensively, scoring 13 goals and 47 points to lead all Penguins defencemen in scoring. However, in seven playoff games, Carlyle went pointless as the Penguins were eliminated by the Boston Bruins in the quarter-finals.

Carlyle saw his offensive production slip in the 1979–80 season, when he scored 8 goals and 36 points in 67 games, although he still led the Penguins defence in scoring. In five playoff games, Carlyle scored one goal as the Penguins were again eliminated by Boston, this time in the preliminary round.

Carlyle had the best season of his career in the 1980–81 season: in 76 games, he scored 16 goals and 83 points to lead all NHL defencemen in scoring. In the 1981 playoffs, Carlyle scored four goals and nine points in five games as the Penguins were eliminated by the St. Louis Blues in the preliminary round. After the season, Carlyle was awarded the James Norris Memorial Trophy for the NHL's best defenceman in the regular season; he was also named to the NHL First All-Star Team and finished 11th in Hart Memorial Trophy voting as the NHL's most valuable player during the regular season.

Carlyle had another very successful season in 1981–82, when he scored 11 goals and 75 points in 73 games, helping Pittsburgh into the 1982 playoffs. In five playoff games, he scored a goal and four points, as the Penguins were eliminated by the New York Islanders in the Patrick Division semi-finals.

Carlyle ran into injuries in the 1982–83 season, as he appeared in only 61 games. However, his offensive production remained impressive, as he scored 15 goals and 56 points to lead the Penguins blue line. The Penguins struggled during the season, and missed the playoffs.

Carlyle struggled in the 1983–84 season, scoring only 3 goals and 26 points in 50 games, his lowest totals since joining the club in 1978. With the Penguins rebuilding, on March 5, Carlyle was traded to the Winnipeg Jets in exchange for the Jets' first-round draft pick in the 1984 NHL Entry Draft (which the Penguins used to select Doug Bodger) and future considerations, which was completed on May 1 when the Jets sent Moe Mantha to the Penguins.

Winnipeg Jets (1984–1993)
Carlyle finished the 1983–84 season with the Jets. However, due to injuries, he appeared in only five games with the club, earning three assists. In three 1984 playoff games, Carlyle recorded two assists as the Jets were swept by the Edmonton Oilers in the Smythe Division semi-final.

In his first full season with the Jets, in 1984–85, Carlyle's offensive production went up, as he scored 13 goals and 51 points in 71 games. In eight playoff games, Carlyle had one goal and six points as the Jets were eliminated by Edmonton in the division final. After the season, Carlyle finished seventh in voting for the Norris Trophy.

In the 1985–86 season, Carlyle tied his career-high with 16 goals, matching his total from 1980 to 1981, and added 33 assists for 49 points in 68 games to lead the Jets defence in scoring. However, due to a late season injury, Carlyle did not appear in any playoff games, as the Jets were swept by the Calgary Flames in the division semi-final.

Carlyle once again tied his career-high in goals with 16 in 1986–87, as well as added 26 assists for 42 points in 71 games, helping the team reach the 1987 playoffs. In ten playoff games, he scored one goal and six points as Winnipeg would lose to Edmonton in the division final.

Carlyle had his best season as a Jet in 1987–88, as he scored 15 goals and 59 points in 78 games for his highest point total in a season since 1981–82. Carlyle also set a career-high with 210 penalty minutes, and would be the only season of his Jets career that he would have over 100 penalty minutes. In the 1988 playoffs, Carlyle had two assists in five games as the Jets were again eliminated by Edmonton Oilers, this time in five games in the division semi-final.

In the 1988–89 season, Carlyle struggled offensively, scoring only six goals, his lowest total since 1983–84, and 44 points in 78 games. The Jets failed to qualify for the playoffs for the first time since Carlyle joined the team.

Injuries plagued Carlyle in the 1989–90 season, as in 53 games, he scored 3 goals and 18 points, his lowest point total since his 1977–78 season with Toronto. Carlyle did not appear in any playoff games as Winnipeg were eliminated by the Edmonton Oilers in seven games in the division semi-final.

Injuries limited Carlyle to only 52 games in the 1990–91 season, as he scored 9 goals and 28 points. The struggling Jets missed the playoffs for the second time in three seasons.

Carlyle's offense struggled greatly in the 1991–92 season, as in 66 games, he scored 1 goal and 10 points, his lowest totals since his rookie season in 1976–77. The Jets made the 1992 playoffs, and in five games, Carlyle scored one goal as the Jets were eliminated by the Vancouver Canucks in the division semi-final.

Carlyle saw limited action with the Jets in the 1992–93 season, playing in 22 games, scoring 1 goal and 2 points. On March 6, 1993, Carlyle played his final NHL game, scoring a goal against Félix Potvin of the Toronto Maple Leafs in a 4–2 Jets loss.

Career statistics

Regular season and playoffs

International

Coaching career

Winnipeg Jets (1993–1996)
Following his retirement as a player, Carlyle remained with the Jets and eventually became an assistant coach with the club in the 1995–96 season under head coach Terry Simpson. The Jets finished the year with a 36–40–6 record to earn the eighth and final playoff position in the Western Conference. Winnipeg faced the Detroit Red Wings and lost to them in six games. Following the season, the Jets relocated to Phoenix, Arizona, and were renamed the Phoenix Coyotes. Carlyle did not follow the team south.

Manitoba Moose (1996–2002)
Carlyle remained in Winnipeg and became an assistant coach with their new International Hockey League (IHL) team, the Manitoba Moose, under head coach Jean Perron. The Moose got off to a rough start in 1996–97, going 16–26–8 in their first 50 games. Hoping to save the season, the Moose then fired Perron and promoted Carlyle to become head coach and general manager. Under Carlyle, the Moose improved and went 16–14–2, although the team failed to make the playoffs.

In his first full season as head coach of the Moose in 1997–98, Carlyle led the team to a 39–36–7 record, as the team reached the playoffs. In the first round, the Moose were swept by the Chicago Wolves.

Manitoba improved to a 47–21–14 record in the 1998–99 season, finishing second in the Midwest Division and reaching the playoffs. In the playoffs, the Moose once again lost to Chicago, in the quarter-finals.

In the 1999–2000 season, the Moose slumped to a 37–36–9 record, however they once again made the playoffs in the final playoff spot in the Western Conference. In the pre-playoff round, the Moose lost to the Long Beach Ice Dogs in two games.

Manitoba improved in the 2000–01 season to a 42–33–7 record, finishing third in the Western Conference and in the playoffs. In the post-season, the Moose lost to the Chicago Wolves in the semi-finals.

Following the season, the IHL folded and the Moose moved to the American Hockey League (AHL) to become the top affiliate of the NHL's Vancouver Canucks. Carlyle was promoted to team president, and Stan Smyl replaced him as head coach in 2001–02.

Washington Capitals (2002–2004)
Carlyle was hired as an assistant coach by the Washington Capitals to work with newly hired head coach Bruce Cassidy for the 2002–03 season. In his first season with the Capitals, the team went 39–29–14, reaching the 2003 playoffs as the sixth seed in the Eastern Conference. In the playoffs, the Capitals were eliminated by the Tampa Bay Lightning in the first round.

Washington struggled badly in the 2003–04 season, with Cassidy being fired after an 8–16–1 start and replaced by Glen Hanlon. Under Hanlon, the Capitals went 15–30–9 as the club finished in 14th place in the Eastern Conference. Carlyle was not brought back after the season.

Manitoba Moose (2004–2005)
Carlyle returned to the Manitoba Moose as head coach for the 2004–05 season. Under Carlyle, the Moose went 44–26–7–3 to finish third in the North Division. In the playoffs, the Moose upset the higher seeded St. John's Maple Leafs and Rochester Americans before losing to the Chicago Wolves in the Western Conference final.

Mighty Ducks of Anaheim/Anaheim Ducks (2005–2011)
On August 1, 2005, Carlyle was hired as head coach of the Mighty Ducks of Anaheim. On October 5, 2005, Carlyle coached his first career NHL game, as the Mighty Ducks defeated the Chicago Blackhawks 5–3.  In his first season with the Mighty Ducks in 2005–06, Carlyle led the team to a 43–27–12 record, earning a 2006 playoff berth. In the post-season, the Mighty Ducks would be eliminated by the Edmonton Oilers in the Western Conference final.

The Mighty Ducks rebranded themselves as the Anaheim Ducks in 2006–07, and the club finished with a 48–20–14 record, winning their first division title in franchise history, and with it the second seed in the Western Conference. In the 2007 playoffs, the Ducks defeated the Minnesota Wild, Vancouver Canucks and Detroit Red Wings, earning a spot in the 2007 Stanley Cup Finals. In the final round against the Ottawa Senators, the Ducks would defeat Ottawa in five games to win their first Stanley Cup in team history.

The Ducks had another successful season in 2007–08, going 47–27–8 to clinch a playoff spot. In the playoffs, the Ducks were upset by the Dallas Stars in the first round. Carlyle reached a milestone on February 8, 2008, as he won his 121st game with the Ducks, setting the franchise record for wins by a head coach.

In 2008–09, Anaheim slumped to a 42–33–7 record, however they snuck into the playoffs as the eighth and final seed in the Western Conference. In the playoffs, the Ducks defeated the top-seeded San Jose Sharks before falling to the Detroit Red Wings in the second round.

The Ducks struggled in the 2009–10 season, going 39–32–11 and failing to reach the playoffs for the first time since Carlyle became head coach.

Anaheim rebounded with a very successful regular season in 2010–11, going 47–30–5, their highest point total since the 2007–08 season, and returned to the playoffs. In the post-season, the Ducks lost to the Nashville Predators in the first round.

The Ducks struggled badly to begin the 2011–12 season, as the club was 7–13–4 in their first 24 games. On November 30, 2011, the Ducks fired Carlyle and replaced him with former Washington Capitals head coach Bruce Boudreau.

Toronto Maple Leafs (2012–2015)
On March 2, 2012, the Toronto Maple Leafs hired Carlyle as the head coach of the team. At the time of the hiring, the Maple Leafs had a 29–28–7 record. On March 3, Carlyle coached his first game with the Leafs, leading the team to a 3–1 win over the Montreal Canadiens. Under Carlyle, the rebuilding club finished the 2011–12 season with a 6–9–3 record in 18 games, failing to reach the playoffs.

In his first full season with Toronto in 2012–13, the Leafs finished with a 26–17–5 record in the lockout-shortened season to qualify for the Stanley Cup playoffs for the first time since 2004. In the playoffs, the Leafs were eliminated by the Boston Bruins in seven games in the first round. In Game 7, the Leafs held a 4–1 lead midway through the third period, however, the Bruins stormed back to tie the game and send it into overtime, in which Boston won the game, and series.

In the 2013–14 season, the Leafs finished the season with a 38–36–8 record. With 14 games to play, the Leafs appeared to be comfortably in a spot in the 2014 playoffs. However, they went 2–12 the rest of the way and missed the playoffs.

On January 6, 2015, Carlyle was fired after Toronto lost seven of their last ten games, going 2–7 since and including their first loss in that such stretch of games. Problems in the Leafs defensive and possession game, as well as the lack of advanced statistics progress despite personal additions and line-up changes, also played a role. He finished his tenure as Toronto head coach with a 91–78–19 record.

Return to Anaheim (2016–2019)
On June 14, 2016, the Ducks announced Carlyle had returned to the team to become their head coach.

On February 10, 2019, the Ducks terminated Carlyle's position as head coach after going 2–15–4 since December 18, with general manager Bob Murray to serve as interim head coach for the remainder of the 2018–19 season.

NHL coaching record

Awards and achievements
 OMJHL Second All-Star Team (1976)
 Norris Trophy winner (1981)
 NHL First AlI-Star Team (1981)
 "Honoured Member" of the Manitoba Hockey Hall of Fame
 Stanley Cup champion (2007)

See also
 List of NHL players with 1,000 games played

References

External links

1956 births
Living people
Anaheim Ducks coaches
Canadian ice hockey coaches
Canadian ice hockey defencemen
Cincinnati Stingers draft picks
Dallas Black Hawks players
Ice hockey people from Ontario
James Norris Memorial Trophy winners
Manitoba Moose coaches
National Hockey League All-Stars
Pittsburgh Penguins players
Sportspeople from Greater Sudbury
Stanley Cup champions
Stanley Cup championship-winning head coaches
Sudbury Wolves players
Toronto Maple Leafs coaches
Toronto Maple Leafs draft picks
Toronto Maple Leafs players
Washington Capitals coaches
Winnipeg Jets (1972–1996) captains
Winnipeg Jets (1972–1996) coaches
Winnipeg Jets (1979–1996) players
Canadian people of Finnish descent